Pontibacter korlensis  is a Gram-negative and rod-shaped bacterium from the genus of Pontibacter which has been isolated from the desert of Xinjiang in China.

References

External links
Type strain of Pontibacter korlensis at BacDive -  the Bacterial Diversity Metadatabase

Cytophagia
Bacteria described in 2008